Camposampiero is a town and comune in the province of Padua, Veneto, northern Italy. The 15th-century Santuario del Noce, a Roman Catholic chapel dedicated to Anthony of Padua, is located in Camposampiero.

Twin towns – sister cities
Camposampiero is twinned with
  Jasło, Poland, since November 2002

Notable people 
 Maurizio Bedin, footballer
 Dino Baggio, footballer

References

Cities and towns in Veneto